The red howlers are five species of howler monkeys that used to be considered conspecific:

 Colombian red howler or Venezuelan red howler (Alouatta seniculus) – northwestern South America
 Bolivian red howler (Alouatta sara) – Santa Cruz Department, Bolivia
 Guyanan red howler (Alouatta macconnelli) – northeastern South America
 Juruá red howler (Alouatta juara) – southeastern Amazon basin
 Purus red howler (Alouatta puruensis) – southeastern Amazon basin

Folivores
 
Primates of South America
Primates of Central America